Chenar Bagali (also Romanized as Chenār Bagālī, Chenār Bāghaleh, Chenār Bāgheleh, Chenār Begālī, and Chinār Bāghle; also known as Robāghaleh) is a village in Koregah-e Gharbi Rural District, in the Central District of Khorramabad County, Lorestan Province, Iran. At the 2006 census, its population was 222, in 50 families.

References 

Towns and villages in Khorramabad County